Amit Kumar Dhankar (born 2 January 1987) is a freestyle wrestler from India. He became Asian wrestling champion in 2013, along with becoming Commonwealth wrestling champion twice. He also won gold medal in the 2016 South Asian Games. In 2015, he participated in the inaugural edition of the Pro Wrestling League, where his team won the title. He is employed as an inspector in the Haryana Police.

Owing to the presence of Yogeshwar Dutt in Dhankar's weight category, he could hardly get a chance to represent India in the events like Commonwealth Games, Asian Games, World Wrestling Championships, Olympic Qualifiers, etc. In 2014, Dhankar moved to the Delhi High Court after the Wrestling Federation of India shortlisted Yogeshwar Dutt for the 2014 Commonwealth Games without conducting trials, but to no avail. In 2015, at the trails for the World Wrestling Championships, Yogeshwar Dutt was able to defeat Dhankar to secure his place in the 65 Kg category of the Freestyle. In 2016, Yogeshwar again defeated Dhankar in the trials of the Asian Olympic qualifiers.

References

External links
 Profile by the Indian Olympic Association.

Indian male sport wrestlers
Sport wrestlers from Haryana
Living people
1987 births
South Asian Games gold medalists for India
South Asian Games medalists in wrestling
Asian Wrestling Championships medalists
20th-century Indian people
21st-century Indian people